Mohamed Gaber Tawfik Hussein (born 9 May 1995) commonly known as Mido Gaber is an Egyptian footballer who plays for Misr Lel Makkasa as an attacking midfielder.

In January 2019, he returned to Misr Lel Makkasa and he signed a 3.5 year contract.

References

External links

Living people
1995 births
Egyptian footballers
Association football midfielders
Footballers from Cairo
Egyptian Premier League players
Al Ahly SC players
Misr Lel Makkasa SC players